Nicholas Bryan McDevitt (born April 21, 1979) is a college basketball coach and the current head coach for Middle Tennessee State University (MTSU). McDevitt came to MTSU from his alma mater, UNC Asheville, where he compiled a 98–66 record and led the Bulldogs to consecutive Big South Conference regular season titles in 2017 and 2018.

Head coaching record

References

1979 births
Living people
American men's basketball coaches
Basketball coaches from North Carolina
Basketball players from North Carolina
College men's basketball head coaches in the United States
Middle Tennessee Blue Raiders men's basketball coaches
Point guards
UNC Asheville Bulldogs men's basketball coaches
UNC Asheville Bulldogs men's basketball players
People from Marshall, North Carolina
American men's basketball players